Garuga pinnata is a deciduous tree species from the family Burseraceae.

It occurs in Asia: from the Indian sub-continent, southern China and Indo-China; in Vietnam it may be called dầu heo.  No subspecies are listed in the Catalogue of Life.

Description and ecology

Plant galls may occur on G. pinnata caused by Phacopteron lentiginosum (Psylloidea: Phacopteronidae), whose populations may be regulated by parasitoids.

References

External links

Burseraceae
Plants described in 1814
Trees of China
Trees of the Indian subcontinent
Trees of Indo-China